Very long-chain specific acyl-CoA dehydrogenase, mitochondrial (VLCAD) is an enzyme that in humans is encoded by the ACADVL  gene.

Mutations in the ACADVL are associated with very long-chain acyl-coenzyme A dehydrogenase deficiency. The protein encoded by this gene is targeted to the inner mitochondrial membrane, where it catalyzes the first step of the mitochondrial fatty acid beta-oxidation pathway. This acyl-Coenzyme A dehydrogenase is specific to long-chain and very-long-chain fatty acids. A deficiency in this gene product reduces myocardial fatty acid beta-oxidation and is associated with cardiomyopathy. Alternative splicing results in multiple transcript variants encoding different isoforms.

Structure

The ACADVL gene contains 20 exons, and is about 5.4 kb long. VLCAD has interesting gene structure in humans, in that is located in a head-to-head structure with the DLG4 gene on Chromosome 17, and that the transcribed regions of these genes overlap. It has been shown that treatment with DEHP results in upregulation by the minimal promoter. While DLG4 and VLCAD share common regulatory elements, they each have separate and distinct tissue-specific elements that confer their function. In mice, these two genes are in a head-to-head orientation, but they do not overlap.

Function 

The VLCAD enzyme catalyzes most of fatty acid beta-oxidation by forming a C2-C3 trans-double bond in the fatty acid. VLCAD is specific to very long-chain fatty acids, typically C16-acylCoA and longer. In mice that have VLCAD deficiency, there is little to no protein hyperacetylation in the liver; this implies that the VLCAD protein is also necessary for protein acetylation in this biological system.

Clinical significance

ACADVL is linked with very long-chain acyl-coenzyme A dehydrogenase deficiency (VLCADD), which has many symptoms, and typically presents as one of three phenotypes. The first is severe, with an early childhood onset and high mortality rate; the most common symptom is this form is cardiomyopathy. The second is a late onset childhood form, with milder symptoms that present most commonly as hypoketotic hypoglycemia. The final form presents in adulthood, and presents as isolated skeletal muscle involvement, rhabdomyolysis, and myoglobinuria, which is triggered by exercise or fasting. The disease is typically diagnosed by first performing tandem mass spectrometry on a blood sample of the patient during a period of stress, and then performing molecular genetic testing for the presence of the ACADVL gene. The deficiency is treated systematically, but certain conditions such as fasting, myocardial irritation, dehydration, and high fat diets are avoided in attempt to prevent secondary complications.

Interactions 
ACADVL has been shown to have 75 binary protein-protein interactions including 73 co-complex interactions. ACADVL appears to interact with RPSA and GPHN.

See also 
 Acyl CoA dehydrogenase

References

Further reading

External links 
 GeneReviews/NCBI/NIH/UW entry on Very long-chain acyl-coenzyme A dehydrogenase deficiency